The Sunbeam Crusader, originally known as the Sunbeam 150 hp, Sunbeam 110 hp or Sunbeam 100 hp (variations on the engine may also have been referred to as Sunbeam 120 hp or Sunbeam 135 hp), was an early British, side-valve, water-cooled, V-8 aero engine first marketed in 1913.

Design and development

The first aero-engine from Louis Coatalen was the 110 hp, a water-cooled V-8 with side-valve cylinders of 80mm (3.15 in) bore and 150mm (5.9 in) stroke. The later versions of the engine, which had 90mm (3.5 in) bore cylinders, were known as the 150 hp until the Sunbeam naming system labelled it the Crusader in 1917. The 80mm bore versions were produced in limited numbers, mostly for civil use, but later 90mm bore engines had limited success in civil applications, with more than 226 built for military aircraft.

Production examples were rated at 150 hp (112 kW) at 2,000 rpm, had a bore of 90mm (3.5 in), stroke of 150mm (5.9 in), two valves per cylinder, and weighed 480 lb (220 kg) dry. The engine was used in a wide variety of British military aircraft during the first years of World War I, most notably the Short 827 seaplane for which six of the original versions were ordered followed by 107 of the more powerful type.

Further development of the Crusader resulted in the Sunbeam Zulu and V-12 Sunbeam Mohawk and Sunbeam Gurkha. The Gurkha engine preserved at the Fleet Air Arm Museum, Yeovilton, Somerset, England, is the only surviving Sunbeam side-valve engine in the UK. It is installed in the Short 184, aircraft number 8359, that played a minor role in the Battle of Jutland at the end of May 1916. The pilot on that occasion was Flight Lieutenant Frederick Rutland (who was ever after known as "Rutland of Jutland"),

Variants
110 hp
150 hp
160 hp
Original designation for the 100mm (3.94in) bore Sunbeam Zulu, derivative of the Crusader.
200 hp
Initial version of the V-12 Mohawk built with 80mm (3.15in) bore, developing . The Admiralty required more powerful engines than the Crusader, so Coatalen designed the Sunbeam  as a 60 degree V-12 using blocks of three cylinders instead of the twin-cylinder blocks of the Crusader.
225 hp
Short seaplanes using this engine were often called "225s". During 1917 this engine was re-named as the Sunbeam Mohawk.
Crusader
The name Crusader was applied to the engine in 1917 after production had ceased, and officially referred only to the later '150hp' version.
Zulu
Outwardly identical to the Crusader, the Zulu was developed during 1915, the bore was increased from 90 mm to 100 mm and the reduction gear ratio was changed to 1.86:1, allowing the engine to develop  at 2000 rpm. 75 Zulus were built.
Mohawk
The Mohawk was the Sunbeam 225hp re-named.
Gurkha
The Gurkha was developed as a replacement for the Mohawk with a bore of 100 mm (3.94in) and the gear ratio was reduced to 1.86:1, giving  at 2000 rpm. Production ended in October 1916, after 74 units had been supplied to power the Short 184 seaplanes of the Royal Naval Air Service.

Applications
Data from:- Sunbeam Aero-Engines

Specifications (150hp / Crusader)

See also

References

Bibliography
 Brew,  Alec. Sunbeam Aero-Engines. Airlife Publishing. Shrewsbury.

Further reading

External links
 
 

Crusader
1910s aircraft piston engines